Adelina Zulfatovna Galyavieva (born 2 October 1996) is a Russian-French ice dancer. With her former skating partner, Louis Thauron, she is the 2021 French National Champion, the 2018 Bosphorus Cup bronze medalist and made her Grand Prix debut at the 2018 Internationaux de France.

Personal life 
Galyavieva was born on 2 October 1996 in Kazan, Russia. She has also resided in Moscow and Lyon, and has received French citizenship.

Career

Early years 
Galyavieva began skating as a six-year-old, in 2002. As a junior ice dancer, she competed first with Vladislav Antonov and later with Alexei Karpushov, coached by Alexander Zhulin and Oleg Volkov in Moscow. She made no international appearances for Russia.

Partnership with Abecassis 
In 2014, Galyavieva began a partnership with French ice dancer Laurent Abecassis and changed her country of representation to France. The two were coached by Muriel Zazoui, Diana Ribas, and Olivier Schoenfelder in Lyon, France. In 2015, they competed at an ISU Junior Grand Prix event, placing 8th in Bratislava, Slovakia.

Galyavieva/Abecassis made their senior international debut at the International Cup of Nice in October 2016. They competed at six further internationals, including two ISU Challenger Series events, but won no medals. The International Cup of Nice in October 2017 was their final competition as a team.

Partnership with Thauron 
Galyavieva teamed up with French ice dancer Louis Thauron after a tryout in Lyon on 14 February 2018. The two decided to represent France but train in Moscow, coached by Russia's Anjelika Krylova and Oleg Volkov. Making their debut, they placed 8th at the 2018 CS Ondrej Nepela Trophy in September.

As France's host pick, Galyavieva/Thauron competed at the 2018 Internationaux de France, placing 10th overall at the November Grand Prix event. In December, they won their first international medal, bronze at Turkey's Bosphorus Cup, and then took bronze at the French Championships. They were subsequently named to France's team for the 2019 European Championships, where they placed twelfth.

Programs

With Thauron

With Abecassis

Competitive highlights 
GP: Grand Prix; CS: Challenger Series; JGP: Junior Grand Prix

With Thauron

With Abecassis

References

External links 

 

1996 births
Living people
Naturalized citizens of France
French female ice dancers
Sportspeople from Kazan
Russian emigrants to France
Universiade bronze medalists for France
Universiade medalists in figure skating
Competitors at the 2019 Winter Universiade